Danton is a 1970 BBC-TV television movie starring Anthony Hopkins. The film is a dramatization of events during the French Revolution.

Cast
Anthony Hopkins stars as the charismatic revolutionary leader Georges Danton in conflict with Maximilien Robespierre, played by Alan Dobie. Also featured are Geoffrey Bayldon as Couthon , David Andrews as Saint-Just, and Mark Jones as Desmoulins.

Reception and reviews
With Hopkins' other television work of 1970, the film officially shares credit for his nomination as Best Actor at that year's British Academy of Film and Television Arts awards.

References

External links
 

British television films